The 2006 Spanish Grand Prix (officially the Formula 1 Gran Premio Telefónica de España 2006) was a Formula One motor race held on 14 May 2006 at the Circuit de Catalunya in Montmeló, Spain. It was the sixth round of the 2006 Formula One season and the forty-eighth Spanish Grand Prix. The 66-lap race was won by Fernando Alonso for the Renault team, from a pole position start. Michael Schumacher finished second in a Ferrari with Alonso's teammate Giancarlo Fisichella third.

As a consequence of the race, Alonso stretched his lead to fifteen points in the Drivers' Championship over Schumacher. Alonso's team, Renault, also increased their lead, but did so in the Constructors' Championship standings. This put them nineteen points ahead of Ferrari.

Report

Background
The Grand Prix was contested by eleven teams with two drivers each. The teams (also known as Constructors) were Renault, McLaren, Ferrari, Toyota, Williams, Honda, Red Bull, BMW, MF1, Toro Rosso and Super Aguri.

Before the race, Renault driver Fernando Alonso led the Drivers' Championship with 44 points; Ferrari driver Michael Schumacher was second on 31 points. Behind Alonso and Schumacher in the Drivers' Championship, Kimi Räikkönen was third on 23 points in a McLaren, with Giancarlo Fisichella and Felipe Massa on 18 and 15 points respectively. In the Constructors' Championship, Renault were leading on 62 points and Ferrari were second on 46 points, with McLaren third on 42 points.

Friday drivers
The bottom 6 teams in the 2005 Constructors' Championship and Super Aguri were entitled to run a third car in free practice on Friday. These drivers drove on Friday but did not compete in qualifying or the race.

Practice and qualifying
Three practice sessions were held before the Sunday race – two on Friday, and one on Saturday. The Friday morning and afternoon sessions each lasted 90 minutes; the third session, on Saturday morning, lasted for an hour.

Saturday afternoon's qualifying session was divided into three parts. The first part ran for 15 minutes, and cars that finished the session 17th position or lower were eliminated from qualifying. The second part of the qualifying session lasted 15 minutes and eliminated cars that finished in positions 11 to 16. The final part of the qualifying session ran for 20 minutes which determined the positions from first to tenth, and decided pole position. Cars which failed to make the final session could refuel before the race, so ran lighter in those sessions.

Alonso clinched his second pole position of the season with a time of 1:14.648, and was joined on the front row by teammate Fisichella. Michael Schumacher took third place on the grid, with a qualifying time more than one-tenth slower than Alonso's.

Classification

Qualifying

Notes
  – Jacques Villeneuve started 22nd after taking a 10 spot penalty for an engine change. The engine was damaged during transport to Barcelona.

Race

Championship standings after the race

Drivers' Championship standings

Constructors' Championship standings

 Note: Only the top five positions are included for both sets of standings.

See also 
 2006 Catalunya GP2 Series round

References

External links

Detailed Spanish Grand Prix results

Spanish Grand Prix
Spanish Grand Prix
Grand Prix
May 2006 sports events in Europe